Mirosternus is a genus of beetles in the family Ptinidae. There are at least 70 described species in Mirosternus.

Species
These 70 species belong to the genus Mirosternus:

 Mirosternus acutus Blackburn, 1885 i c g
 Mirosternus affinis Perkins, 1910 i c g
 Mirosternus amatus Perkins, 1910 i c g
 Mirosternus amaurodes Perkins, 1910 i c g
 Mirosternus angulatus Perkins, 1910 i c g
 Mirosternus basalis Perkins, 1910 i c g
 Mirosternus bicolor Sharp, 1881 i c g
 Mirosternus blackburni Perkins, 1910 i c g
 Mirosternus blackburnioides Perkins, 1910 i c g
 Mirosternus carinatus Sharp, 1881 i c g
 Mirosternus cognatus Perkins, 1910 i c g
 Mirosternus debilis Sharp, 1881 i c g
 Mirosternus denudatus Perkins, 1910 i c g
 Mirosternus dimidiatus Perkins, 1910 i c g
 Mirosternus discolor Perkins, 1910 i c g
 Mirosternus dubiosus Perkins, 1910 i c g
 Mirosternus duplex Perkins, 1910 i c g
 Mirosternus elongatulus Perkins, 1910 i c g
 Mirosternus epichrysus Perkins, 1910 i c g
 Mirosternus euceras Perkins, 1910 i c g
 Mirosternus eutheorus Perkins, 1910 i c g
 Mirosternus excelsior Perkins, 1910 i c g
 Mirosternus eximius Perkins, 1910 i c g
 Mirosternus fractus Perkins, 1910 i c g
 Mirosternus frigidus Perkins, 1910 i c g
 Mirosternus glabripennis Sharp, 1881 i c g
 Mirosternus hawaiiensis Perkins, 1910 i c g
 Mirosternus hirsutulus Perkins, 1910 i c g
 Mirosternus hypocoelus Perkins, 1910 i c g
 Mirosternus ignotus Perkins, 1910 i c g
 Mirosternus irregularis Perkins, 1910 i c g
 Mirosternus kauaiensis Perkins, 1910 i c g
 Mirosternus konanus Perkins, 1910 i c g
 Mirosternus laevis Perkins, 1910 i c g
 Mirosternus lanaiensis Perkins, 1910 i c g
 Mirosternus latifrons Perkins, 1910 i c g
 Mirosternus lugubris Perkins, 1910 i c g
 Mirosternus marginatus Perkins, 1910 i c g
 Mirosternus maurus Perkins, 1910 i c g
 Mirosternus molokaiensis Perkins, 1910 i c g
 Mirosternus montanus Perkins, 1910 i c g
 Mirosternus muticus Sharp, 1881 i c g
 Mirosternus nigrocastaneus Perkins, 1910 i c g
 Mirosternus obscurus Sharp, 1881 i c g
 Mirosternus oculatus Perkins, 1910 i c g
 Mirosternus pallidicornis Perkins, 1910 i c g
 Mirosternus parcus Perkins, 1910 i c g
 Mirosternus parvulus Perkins, 1910 i c g
 Mirosternus peles Perkins, 1910 i c g
 Mirosternus plebeius Perkins, 1910 i c g
 Mirosternus punctatissimus Perkins, 1910 i c g
 Mirosternus punctatus Sharp, 1881 i c g
 Mirosternus pusillus Perkins, 1910 i c g
 Mirosternus pyrophilus Perkins, 1910 i c g
 Mirosternus rufescens Perkins, 1910 i c g
 Mirosternus rugipennis Perkins, 1910 i c g
 Mirosternus sculptus Perkins, 1910 i c g
 Mirosternus simplex Perkins, 1910 i c g
 Mirosternus solidus Perkins, 1910 i c g
 Mirosternus solitarius Perkins, 1910 i c g
 Mirosternus sordidus Perkins, 1910 i c g
 Mirosternus stenarthrus Perkins, 1910 i c g
 Mirosternus subparcus Perkins, 1910 i c g
 Mirosternus testaceus Perkins, 1910 i c g
 Mirosternus tetragonus Perkins, 1910 i c g
 Mirosternus tristis Perkins, 1910 i c g
 Mirosternus varicolor Perkins, 1910 i c g
 Mirosternus varius Perkins, 1910 i c g
 Mirosternus vestitus Perkins, 1910 i c g
 Mirosternus xanthostictus Perkins, 1910 i c g

Data sources: i = ITIS, c = Catalogue of Life, g = GBIF, b = Bugguide.net

References

Further reading

 
 
 
 
 

Ptinidae